Klara Møller (born 2 July 2001 in Hurup) is a Danish professional squash player. As of November 2022, she was ranked number 116 in the world.

References

2001 births
Living people
Danish female squash players